Giovanni Battista was a common Italian given name (see Battista for those with the surname) in the 16th-18th centuries. It refers to "John the Baptist" in English, the French equivalent is "Jean-Baptiste". Common nicknames include Giambattista, Gianbattista, Giovambattista, or Giambo. In Genoese the nickname was Baciccio, and a common shortening was Giovan Battista, Giobatta or simply G.B.. The people listed below are Italian unless noted otherwise.

 Giovanni Battista Adriani (c.1511–1579), historian.
 Giovanni Battista Agnello (fl. 1560–1577), author and alchemist.
 Giovanni Battista Aleotti (1546–1636), architect.
 Giovanni Battista Amendola (1848–1887), sculptor.
 Giovanni Battista Amici (1786–1863), astronomer and microscopist.
 Giovanni Battista Angioletti (1896-1961), writer and journalist.
 Giovanni Battista Ballanti (1762–1835), sculptor.
 Giovanni Battista Barbiani (1593–1650), painter.
 Giovanni Battista Beccaria (1716–1781), physicist.
 Giovanni Battista Bellandi, sculptor.
 Giovanni Battista Belzoni (1778–1823), explorer.
 Giovanni Battista Bernero (1736–1796), sculptor.
 Giovanni Battista Brocchi (1772–1826), mineralogist and geologist.
 Giovanni Battista Bugatti (1780–1869), executioner.
 Giovanni Battista Buonamente (c.1595–1642), composer and violinist.
 Giovanni Battista Caccini, sculptor.
 Giovanni Battista Caporali (1476–1560), painter.
 Giovanni Battista Caprara (1733–1810), statesman and cardinal.
 Giovanni Battista Caracciolo (1578–1635), artist.
 Giovanni Battista Casanova, painter, brother of Giacomo Casanova.
 Giovanni Battista Castello, painter.
 Giovanni Battista Casti (1724–1803), poet and librettist.
 Giovanni Battista Cavalcaselle (1820–1897), writer and art critic.
 Giovanni Battista Cibo, birth name of Pope Innocent VIII (1432–1492).
 Giovanni Battista Cima (c.1459–c.1517), painter.
 Giovanni Battista Cimaroli (1653–1714), painter.
 Giovanni Battista Cini (1525–c.1586), playwright.
 Giovanni Battista Cipriani (1727–1785), painter and engraver.
 Giovanni Battista Cirri (1724–1808), cellist and composer.
 Giovanni Battista Crespi (1557–1663), painter, sculptor, and architect.
 Giovanni Battista de Campania (1633-1639), 64th Minister General of the OFM
 Giovanni Battista Dieter (1903–1955), German priest.
 Giovanni Battista Donati (1826–1873), astronomer.
 Giovanni Battista Doni (c.1593–1647), musicologist.
 Giovanni Battista Draghi (c.1640–1708), composer.
 Giovanni Battista Ferrandini (1710–1793), composer.
 Giovanni Battista Ferrari, botanist.
 Giovanni Battista Foggini (1652–1737), sculptor.
 Giovanni Battista Gaulli (1639–1709), painter.
 Giovanni Battista Giraldi (1504–1573), novelist and poet.
 Giovanni Battista Grassi (1854–1925), zoologist.
 Giovanni Battista Guadagnini (1711–1786), luthier.
 Giovanni Battista Guarini (1538–1612), poet and diplomat.
 Giovanni Battista Guelphi, 18th century sculptor
 Giovanni Battista Hodierna (1597–1660), astronomer.
 Giovanni Battista di Jacopo, birth name of Rosso Fiorentino (1494–1540), Italian painter.
 Giovanni Battista Lacchini (1884–1967), astronomer.
 Giovanni Battista Landolina, landowner and intellectual.
 Giovanni Battista Lenzi (1951–2009), Italian politician.
 Giovanni Battista Locatelli (disambiguation), several people
 Giovanni Battista Lulli, birth name of Jean-Baptiste Lully (1632–1687), Italian-born French composer.
 Giovanni Battista Lusieri (1755–1821), Italian painter who was involved in the removal of the Elgin Marbles.
 Giovanni Battista Maganza (1513–1586), painter.
 Giovanni Battista Maini (1690–1752), sculptor.
 Giovanni Battista Mancini (1714–1800), voice teacher. 
 Giovanni Battista Martini (1706–1784), musician.
 Giovanni Battista Michelini (1604–1655), painter.
 Giovanni Battista Monte (1498-1551), humanist physician and professor at Padua.  
 Giovanni Battista Monti, painter.
 Giovanni Battista Enrico Antonio Maria Montini, birth name of Pope Paul VI (1897–1978).
 Giovanni Battista Morgagni (1682–1771), anatomist.
 Giovanni Battista Moroni (1520–1578), painter.
 Giovanni Battista Orsenigo (1837–1904), monk and dentist.
 Giovanni Battista Orsini, Grand Master of the Order of the Knights Hospitaller from 1467 to 1476
 Giovanni Battista Paggi (1554–1627), painter.
 Giovanni Battista Pamphili, birth name of Pope Innocent X (1574–1655).
 Giovanni Battista Pergolesi (1710–1736), composer.
 Giovanni Battista Pescetti (c.1704–1766), composer and organist.
 Giovanni Battista Piazzetta (c.1683–1754), painter.
 Giovanni Battista Pioda (1808–1882), Swiss politician.
 Giovanni Battista Piranesi (1720–1778), artist.
 Giovanni Battista di Quadro, Polish-Italian architect.
 Giovanni Battista Re (1934–), cardinal.
 Giovanni Battista Riccioli (1598–1671), astronomer.
 Giovanni Battista Rinuccini (1592–1653), archbishop.
 Giovanni Battista de Rossi (1822–1894), archaeologist.
 Giovanni Battista Rubini (1794–1854), singer.
 Giovanni Battista Sammartini (c.1700–1775), composer and organist.
 Giovanni Battista Salvi da Sassoferrato (1609–1685), painter.
 Giovanni Battista Santini, architect.
 Giovanni Battista Sidotti (1668–1714), Jesuit priest and missionary.
 Giovanni Battista Tempesti, painter.
 Giovanni Battista Tiepolo (1696–1770), painter.
 Giovanni Battista Trevano, architect.
 Giovanni Battista Vaccarini (1702–1768), architect.
 Giovanni Battista Venturi (1746–1822), physicist.
 Giovanni Battista Viotti (1755–1824), violinist and composer.
 Giovanni Battista Vitali, composer.
 Giovanni Battista Volpati, (1633–1706), painter.
 Giovanni Battista Zupi (c.1590–1650), astronomer, mathematician, and Jesuit priest.

Giambattista 
 Giambattista Andreini (1578–1650), actor and playwright.
 Giambattista Basile (1575–1632), poet, courtier, and fairytale collector.
 Giambattista Benedetti (1530–1590), mathematician.
 Giambattista Bodoni (1740–1813), engraver and printer.
 Giambattista De Curtis (1860–1926), painter and poet.
 Giambattista Gelli (1498–1563), humanist.
 Giambattista Marini (1569–1625), poet.
 Giambattista Pittoni (1687–1767), painter.
 Giambattista della Porta (1538–1615), scholar, polymath, and child prodigy.
 Giambattista Valli, fashion designer.
 Giambattista Vico (1668–1744), philosopher, historian, jurist.

Giovan Battista
 Giovan Battista Carpi (1927–1999), Italian cartoonist.
 Giovan Battista Cini, Italian playwright
 Giovan Battista Perasso aka Balilla, legendary revolutionary
 Giovan Battista Pirovano (1937–2014), Italian footballer

Italian masculine given names